The 23rd South American Youth Championships in Athletics were held in Concordia, Argentina on 12 and 13 November 2016.

Medal summary

Men

Women

Mixed

Medal table

References

South American U18 Championships in Athletics
South American U18 Championships in Athletics
South American U18 Championships in Athletics
South American U18 Championships in Athletics
International athletics competitions hosted by Argentina
South American U18 Championships in Athletics